Oleksandr Andriyovych Martynyuk (born 25 November 2001) is a Ukrainian professional footballer who plays as a left back for Ukrainian club FC Oleksandriya.

References

External links
 Profile on Volyn Lutsk official website
 

2001 births
Living people
Place of birth missing (living people)
Ukrainian footballers
Association football defenders
FC Volyn Lutsk players
FC Oleksandriya players
Ukrainian Premier League players
Ukrainian First League players
Ukrainian Second League players